Prisoner of the Night is a 1914 Hungarian film directed by Michael Curtiz.

Plot summary

Cast

References

External links
 
 

1914 films
Films directed by Michael Curtiz
Hungarian silent feature films
Hungarian black-and-white films
Austro-Hungarian films